Monochamus ruspator is a species of beetle in the family Cerambycidae. It was described by Johan Christian Fabricius in 1781, originally under the genus Lamia. It has a wide distribution throughout Africa.

Subspecies
 Monochamus ruspator ruandae Breuning, 1955
 Monochamus ruspator ruspator (Fabricius, 1781)

Varietas
 Monochamus ruspator var. basalis (Chevrolat, 1857)
 Monochamus ruspator var. dentipes (Gyllenhal, 1817)

References

ruspator
Beetles described in 1781